Scopeloides is an extinct genus of prehistoric ray-finned fish that lived during the early Oligocene epoch.

See also

 Prehistoric fish
 List of prehistoric bony fish

References

Oligocene fish
Fossils of the Czech Republic